The cosmogram was a core symbol of the Kongo culture. An ideographic religious symbol, the cosmogram was called dikenga dia Kongo or tendwa kia nza-n' Kongo in the KiKongo language. Ethnohistorical sources and material culture demonstrate that the Kongo cosmogram existed as a long-standing symbolic tradition within the BaKongo culture before European contact in 1482, and that it continued in use in West Central Africa through the early twentieth century. In its fullest embellishment, this symbol served as an emblematic representation of the Kongo people and summarized a broad array of ideas and metaphoric messages that comprised their sense of identity within the cosmos.

Robert Farris Thompson describes it as thus: "Coded as a cross, a quartered circle or diamond, a seashell spiral, or a special cross with solar emblems at each ending - the sign of the four moments of the sun is the Kongo emblem of spiritual continuity and renaissance par excellence. In certain rites it is written on the earth, and a person stands upon it to take an oath, or to signify that he or she understands the meaning of life as a process shared with the dead below the river or the sea - the real sources of earthly power and prestige, in Kongo thinking... The intimation, by shorthand geometric statements, of mirrored worlds within the spiritual journey of the sun, is the source and illumination of some of the more important sculptural gestures and decorative signs pertaining to funerary monuments and objects designated for deposit on the surface of funerary tombs, or otherwise connected with funerary ceremonies and the end of life."

References

Kongo culture
Kingdom of Kongo
African culture
African art
Traditional African medicine
Hoodoo (spirituality)